Pristis aquitanicus is an extinct species of sawfish in the family Pristidae. It lived in the Neogene period in France, Portugal, Florida, and India. It lived in marine, bays, and estuaries. It was a nektobenthic carnivore.

References 

Fossil taxa described in 1871
aquitanicus
Fossils of India
Fossils of France
Prehistoric fish of North America